Jean Verhaert (10 June 1908 – 8 November 1999) was a Belgian sprinter. He competed in the men's 400 metres at the 1936 Summer Olympics.

References

1908 births
1999 deaths
Athletes (track and field) at the 1936 Summer Olympics
Belgian male sprinters
Belgian male middle-distance runners
Olympic athletes of Belgium
Place of birth missing